Horace Tulloch (born 10 October 1930) is a Jamaican cricketer. He played in four first-class matches for the Jamaican cricket team from 1951 to 1962.

See also
 List of Jamaican representative cricketers

References

External links
 

1930 births
Living people
Jamaican cricketers
Jamaica cricketers
Sportspeople from Kingston, Jamaica